Darryl Beamish (born 1941) is a Western Australian man who was wrongfully convicted of wilful murder in 1961 and sentenced to death by hanging. The death sentence was commuted to life imprisonment and he was paroled in 1977. After six appeals, his conviction was finally overturned in 2005.

History
Darryl Beamish, a deaf mute man, was aged 18 in 1959 when the 22-year-old socialite and MacRobertson's chocolate heiress, Jillian MacPherson Brewer, was slain in her Cottesloe flat by an intruder who mutilated her body with a tomahawk and a pair of dressmaking scissors. According to Perth Detective Owen Leitch, 18-year-old Beamish provided four confessions, two through a sign language interpreter, one a written statement and another in notes scrawled on the exercise yard at the Perth lock-up. Beamish said the confessions were obtained through intimidation and threats, and were untrue.

Beamish appealed to the Court of Criminal Appeal on the grounds that the trial judge's directions were in error, and his confession was involuntary and therefore should have been ruled inadmissible or excluded in the trial judge's discretion. The appeal was dismissed on 20 October 1961 and an application for leave to appeal to the High Court of Australia was dismissed on 11 December 1961.

Serial killer Eric Edgar Cooke, who had been questioned in relation to the Brewer murder in January 1960, confessed to the murder on 10 September 1963. Beamish filed a petition to the Attorney-General which was referred to the Court of Criminal Appeal. The Court of Criminal Appeal dismissed the reference on 22 May 1964. Wolff CJ, who had also been the trial judge, held that the case against Beamish was "strong." Virtue J described Cooke as an "utterly worthless scoundrel" and "palpable and unscrupulous liar". The appeal was dismissed. A further application for special leave to appeal to the High Court was dismissed on 14 September 1964, as was an appeal to the Privy Council.

Beamish's case caused continuing concern in legal circles. On the morning of his hanging at Fremantle Prison on 26 October 1964, without prompting, Cooke took the Bible from the prison chaplain and said: "I swear before Almighty God that I killed Anderson and Brewer." In a book titled The Beamish Case (1966), Australian professor of jurisprudence Peter Brett argued that the affair was a "monstrous miscarriage of justice".

Successful appeal

Western Australian journalist Estelle Blackburn's book Broken Lives prompted an appeal by John Button. Button had also been convicted of a crime to which Cooke had confessed before his death.

Button's appeal was allowed on 25 February 2002. The appeal judges' decision was based on fresh forensic evidence obtained by the publisher of Broken Lives, journalist and Post Newspapers publisher Bret Christian, which suggested that Button's vehicle was not involved in Ms Anderson's death (a central part of the prosecution case).

The suggestion, in Christian's Daryl Beamish biography Presumed Guilty, came after Christian wrote about US car crash expert Rusty Haight's testing of vehicles from the time of Anderson's death.

The success of Button's appeal raised doubts about the Court of Criminal Appeal's reasons for rejecting Cooke's confession in Beamish's 1964 appeal. Beamish's conviction was finally overturned by the Court of Criminal Appeal on 1 April 2005.

It also reflected a common theme in Australian evidence legislation. If a prosecution had not commenced at the time the documentary statement came into existence, the requisite purpose would not be proved "unless there was at the time at least a real prospect of a prosecution".

Perth lawyers Tom Percy QC and Jonathan Davies had worked pro bono on both men's appeals for seven years from 1998. They were awarded the Australian Lawyers Alliance West Australian Civil Justice Award in August 2007 for their efforts exposing injustices in the West Australian legal system.

On 2 June 2011, fifty years after his conviction, Beamish was granted a A$425,000 ex gratia payment by the Western Australian government. Attorney-General Christian Porter said the payment was "intended to express the State's sincere regret for what occurred and provide [Beamish] with a measure of comfort and financial security in his retirement."

In popular culture
The murder and ensuing legal proceedings are explored by Bret Christian in 2013 non-fiction book Presumed Guilty.

See also
Ronald Wilson
List of miscarriage of justice cases

References

Bibliography
 'A Case of Science and Justice', pp. 18–22, the Skeptic, Spring 2002
 (review)

External links
Article dated 1 April 2005, covering Beamish's vindication, from the website of the Sydney Morning Herald

Australian deaf people
1941 births
Living people
Overturned convictions in Australia
Place of birth missing (living people)